The Ex-File 3: The Return of the Exes, also known as Ex-File 3, is a 2017 Chinese romantic comedy film directed by Tian Yusheng and is a sequel to the 2014 film Ex-Files  and 2015 film Ex-Files 2.

Cast

Han Geng as 孟云 (Meng Yun)  
Zheng Kai as 余飞 (Yu Fei)
Kelly Yu as 林佳 (Lin Jia)
Zeng Meng Xue as 丁点 (Ding Dian)

Release
It was released in China on 28 December 2018

Box office
As of 26 January 2018, it has earned ¥1.9billion in China.

The film gained some notoriety in the overseas press for beating Star Wars: The Last Jedi at the Chinese box office.

Awards and nominations

See also
 Ex-Files
 Ex-Files 2

References

External links
 

Chinese romantic comedy films
Huayi Brothers films
2017 romantic comedy films
Chinese sequel films